Josh or Joshua Wilson may refer to:

 Joshua Wilson (Maryland politician) (1797–1885), American politician and physician
 Josh Wilson (baseball) (born 1981), American baseball infielder
 Josh Wilson (musician) (born 1983), American contemporary Christian musician
 Josh Wilson (American football) (born 1985), American professional football player
 Josh Wilson (politician), member of the Australian House of Representatives
 Joshua Marie Wilkinson, born Joshua Wilson, American poet, editor, and filmmaker
 Josh Wilson (producer), (born 1990), British television producer and entrepreneur

See also
Joshua Wilson Faulkner (fl. 1809–1820), English portrait painter